Elections were held on 1980 January 3 and 5 to elect members to the sixth Niyamasabha. This election saw the formation of two pre-poll alliances, viz. LDF and UDF, most of whose constituent parties were part of the erstwhile United Front. CPI(M)-led LDF to win the election, after winning 93 seats altogether. E. K. Nayanar was sworn in as the Chief Minister on 26 March 1980

History
The Congress party had split into two splinter parties, the INC (I) and the INC (U). Kerala Congress too underwent a split, with the formation of KC (M) and the KC (J). The ML (O) assumed the name AIML. The United Front which won the 1977 election, had dissolved in 1979 which lead to the creation of two long-running alliance formula in the state:

 The United Democratic Front (UDF) consisting of the INC (I), the IUML, the KC (J), the PSP, the NDP, and the SRP
 The Left Democratic Front (LDF) comprising, the CPM, the CPI, the INC (U), the KC (M), the KC (PG), the AIML, and the RSP

Results

Party Wise Results

Constituency Wise Results

Aftermath

Formation of Ministry 
On 25 January 1980, a 17 member ministry headed by E.K. Nayanar of CPI(M) was sworn in, revoking President's rule.

Withdrawal of support 
Despite the thumping majority for the LDF in the Assembly, the Nayanar government’s majority depended on the support of 21 members of the Congress (U), led by A. K. Antony, as well as eight members of the Mani faction of the Kerala Congress. Both of these factions had trouble with the CPI (M) style of rule, and withdrew their support on 16 October 1981, leading to Nayanar’s resignation 4 days later.

Formation of new government 
Following two months of uncertainty, Congress (S) decided to suppoer Congress (Indira), and an eight-member ministry was formed on 28 December 1981, with K. Karunakaran, of Indira-Congress, at the helm. It was the twelfth ministry in Kerala. However Karunakaran couldn’t build a comfortable majority either, as troubles began to rise as the Congress (S) split into two factions, 16 members joining the Antony group and six remaining as members of the Chacko group, along with a split in Janata Party.

With these shifts, the Assembly was divided exactly down the middle, with the ruling front of the Congress and the CPI (M)-led Opposition both having 70 MLAs each. The only vote that shifted the balance was Speaker A. C. Jose’s. His casting vote, exercised eight times, was the only thing that kept the Karunakaran government in power for nearly three months.

The deadlock finally came to an end when Lonappan Nambadan, a founder-member of the Kerala Congress – then allied with the ruling United Democratic Front – voted against the government. On 17 March 1982, the Karunakaran government resigned and the Assembly was dissolved. The state came under President’s rule for the eighth time, forcing an interim election in 1982.

References

External links 
 Kerala Assembly Election DATABASE

Kerala
State Assembly elections in Kerala
1980s in Kerala